Hamad Al-Dawsari (born 11 March 1994) is a Saudi Arabian professional footballer who plays as a left back for Al-Arabi.

Career
Al-Dawsari began his career at Al-Jandal before joining the youth ranks of Al-Nassr in 2012. He spent just a year with Al-Nassr before joining newly promoted Pro League side Al-Orobah. Al-Dawsari spent 5 years with Al-Orobah spending two seasons in the top flight of Saudi football, the Pro League. On July 21, 2018, Al-Dawsari joined Al-Adalah, where he played an important part in the club's promotion to the Pro League. On 2 October 2020, Al-Dawsari joined Al-Khaleej. On 19 July 2022, Al-Dawsari joined Al-Arabi.

References

External links 
 

1994 births
Living people
Saudi Arabian footballers
Al Jandal Club players
Al Nassr FC players
Al-Orobah FC players
Al-Adalah FC players
Al-Ain FC (Saudi Arabia) players
Khaleej FC players
Al-Arabi SC (Saudi Arabia) players
Saudi Professional League players
Saudi First Division League players
Association football fullbacks